The 1993 European Wrestling Championships were held in the Greco-Romane and the men's Freestyle  style in Istanbul 1 – 7 January 1993; and  the women's  Freestyle style in Ivanovo  1 – 3 January 1993.

Medal table

Medal summary

Men's freestyle

Men's Greco-Roman

Women's freestyle

References

External links
Fila's official championship website

Europe
W
W
European Wrestling Championships
Euro
Euro
Sports competitions in Istanbul
1993 in European sport